Acrolophus punctata is a moth of the family Acrolophidae first described by Herbert Druce in 1901. It is found in Costa Rica.

References

Moths described in 1901
punctata